Rick Miaskiewicz (born March 22, 1953) is a former American race car driver from Pittsburgh.  He won the Can-Am championship in 1985, the series' next to last year of operations, and then moved to the CART series for 1986.  He competed in five races in a Cosworth-powered March chassis.  He returned the following year with a 1986 March and competed in four more races.  His best CART finish was an 11th place at Cleveland in 1986, one of the best finishes for any rookie that season. Miaskiewicz also raced AMA Motocross and was an Alpine Ski racer.

External links

1953 births
Champ Car drivers
Living people
Racing drivers from Pennsylvania
Racing drivers from Pittsburgh
Sportspeople from Pittsburgh